Wildwood is a ghost town in Coahoma County, Mississippi, United States.

Wildwood was a stop on the Mobile & North Western Railroad, completed in the 1870s. The population in 1900 was 37. In 1905, the post office at Wildwood was discontinued.

References

Former populated places in Coahoma County, Mississippi
Former populated places in Mississippi